The Heroes Cup is an annual basketball cup competition for the premier teams in Rwanda. The Heroes Cup tournaments are organised by their respective federations in partnership with the Chancellery for Heroes, National Orders and Decorations of Honour (CHENO). The final of the cup is played each year on National Heroes' Day on February 1.

Men tournament

Women tournament

References

See also
National Basketball League (Rwanda)

Basketball competitions in Rwanda
Basketball leagues in Africa